The Barrett Nunataks are a group of nunataks located on the east side of the Dott Ice Rise overlooking Constellation Inlet, in the Heritage Range, Ellsworth Mountains. They were named by the University of Minnesota Ellsworth Mountains Party, 1962–63, for Peter J. Barrett, geologist with the party.

References
 

Nunataks of Ellsworth Land